The War with Grandpa is a 2020 American family comedy film directed by Tim Hill, from a screenplay by Tom J. Astle and Matt Ember, based upon the novel of the same name by Robert Kimmel Smith. The film is about a young boy named Peter (Oakes Fegley) who fights in a prank war with his grandfather (Robert De Niro) to get his grandfather to move out of his room after he moves in with his family. Uma Thurman, Rob Riggle, Laura Marano, Cheech Marin, Jane Seymour, and Christopher Walken also star.

Originally filmed in May 2017, The War with Grandpas release was delayed several times due to photography changes and the closure of The Weinstein Company, the original distributor. The film was eventually released theatrically in the United States on October 9, 2020 by 101 and Brookdale Studios, as well as abroad beginning in August 2020 by Brookdale Studios. It received generally negative reviews from critics and grossed $43 million worldwide against a production budget of $38 million. A sequel is in development.

Plot
After accidentally stealing from a grocery store due to having trouble with the self-checkouts and causing a scene with the store manager, recently widowed Ed Marino (Robert De Niro) is visited by his daughter Sally Marino-Decker (Uma Thurman), who wants him to move in with her family. Ed does not want to leave his house because he built it himself. Sally convinces Ed to move in with her and gives him her son Peter's (Oakes Fegley) bedroom. Peter is not happy about giving his room to his grandfather and being moved to the attic. Ed is welcomed by Sally's husband Arthur (Rob Riggle) and two daughters, Mia (Laura Marano) and Jenny (Poppy Gagnon). During his first day, Ed spends most of his time in his new room, sitting in his chair and looking at the sky, still thinking about his late wife.

Peter then tells his friends Billy (Juliocesar Chavez), Steve (Isaac Kragten) and Emma (T.J. McGibbon) about his grandfather moving in with his family and living in his room. After a miserable first night in his new room, Peter decides to declare war. Ed agrees, as long as they follow the rules of engagement: they cannot damage other people's belongings and cannot tell the family about their arrangement. Peter pulls a series of pranks, including replacing Ed's shaving cream with quick-drying foam and damaging his record player. Ed gets back at Peter with pranks including removing all of the screws from Peter's furniture and rewriting his school report. Ed turns to his friends Danny (Cheech Marin) and Jerry (Christopher Walken) for some advice. Over time, Ed begins to spend time with his granddaughters and son-in-law and learns how to use modern technology, such as self-checkouts and apps.

Sally learns that Mia is dating a boy named Russell (Colin Ford), whom she does not approve of. Ed invites Jerry, Danny, and Diane (Jane Seymour) (a store worker Ed has befriended) to play dodgeball against Peter and his friends. Peter and his friends win the first round, but Ed and his team manage to beat them during the second round. However, during the third round, Danny's jaw is injured; as a result, the game is declared a tie. Later, Peter pushes the button on Ed's emergency call necklace, and Ed picks Peter up from school to take him fishing. The two discover that it is illegal to fish there. Ed then takes Peter to his old house and explains that he left some secrets in the walls.

Ed learns that Peter is being bullied, so he, Danny, and Jerry throw the bully in a dumpster. At Jenny's Christmas-themed birthday party, Peter keeps his promise about not pulling any pranks. Peter rigs up an ejector seat for Ed, who is supposed to be playing the part of Santa that night. Unfortunately, a last-minute change results in Jerry being dressed up as Santa. Throughout the party, Peter and Ed are asked to help out. Instead, they continue to prank each other, including spraying bottles at each other and Peter plugging the cord to the lights as Ed checks them, shocking Ed. As a result of their hijinks, they inadvertently reveal their war with each other to everyone. Jerry gets ejected from his chair, resulting in further property damage and injuries to multiple guests. During this, Jenny's Christmas tree prop falls onto the house, leaving a hole in Mia's room and revealing Mia's secret tryst with Russell. Afterwards, Ed is injured and taken to the hospital.

As punishment, Arthur and Sally place Peter and Mia under "work arrest" for six months. Russell shows up; Sally initially seems angry at him, but instead welcomes him. Sally goes to pick up Ed from the hospital, but learns that he has already checked out and his Lyft driver Chuck (Joe Gelchion) has taken him to his old house. Peter decides to make amends, and begs Ed to move back in with the family. The two finally reconcile, as Sally listens. As time passes, Ed and Peter seem to finally be getting along until Ed leaves one day to be with Diane, with whom he is now in a relationship. Peter looks on angrily, declaring a war on both of them as they leave.

Cast

 Robert De Niro as Ed Marino, Mia, Peter & Jenny's maternal grandfather and Sally's father. In the book, the character is named Jack.
 Oakes Fegley as Peter Decker, Ed's grandson, Sally & Arthur's son and Mia & Jenny's brother
 Uma Thurman as Sally Marino-Decker, Ed's daughter, Mia, Peter & Jenny's mother, and Arthur's wife
 Rob Riggle as Arthur Decker, Mia, Peter & Jenny's father and Sally's husband
 Laura Marano as Mia Decker, Ed's older granddaughter, Arthur & Sally's daughter and Peter & Jenny's older sister
 Poppy Gagnon as Jenny Decker, Ed's younger granddaughter, Arthur & Sally's daughter, and Mia & Peter's younger sister
 Cheech Marin as Danny, one of Ed's two friends
 Christopher Walken as Jerry, one of Ed's two friends
 Jane Seymour as Diane, who befriends Ed, Jerry and Danny
 Juliocesar Chavez as Billy, one of Peter's friends
 Isaac Kragten as Steve, one of Peter's friends
 T.J. McGibbon as Emma, one of Peter's friends
 Lydia Styslinger as Lisa, Steve's older sister
 Colin Ford as Russell, Mia's boyfriend
 Joe Gelchion as Chuck, Ed's Lyft driver who Ed says is his brother to get out of the hospital
 Faizon Love as David, a grocery store manager
 Rutanya Alda as Lynn Marino
 Kendrick Cross as Insurance Adjuster
 Drew Scheid as the 8th Grade Monster

Production
The film was adapted from the novel of the same name, written by Robert Kimmel Smith. In 2013, producer Marvin and Rosa Peart's eight-year-old son Tre brought the book to their attention. After acquiring the rights, principal photography on the film began on May 2, 2017, in Atlanta, Georgia, where it shot for 12 weeks.

Release
The War with Grandpa was initially scheduled to be released by The Weinstein Company's Dimension Films on April 21, 2017, which was later pushed back to October 20, 2017, due to principal photography location changes. In August 2017 the film was again delayed, this time to February 23, 2018.

In January 2018, less than a month before its intended release, the film was pulled from the release schedule. In March 2018, it was announced The Weinstein Company would no longer distribute the film, and its rights were reclaimed by the producers for $2.5 million. In June 2020, 101 and Brookdale Studios acquired distribution rights to the film and set it for a September 18, 2020 release; it was later pushed back to October 9. The studios spent an estimated $24 million promoting the film.

Reception

Box office 
The War with Grandpa grossed $21.3 million in the United States and Canada, and $22.1 million in other territories, for a worldwide total of $43.4 million.

In the US, the film made $1.1 million from 2,250 theaters on its first day of release. It went on to debut to $3.6 million, becoming the first film to top Tenet at the box office. In its second weekend the film grossed $2.5 million, finishing second behind newcomer Honest Thief, and then made $1.9 million in its third weekend and $1.1 million in its fourth week. After six weeks the film stood at $15.5 million domestically, with industry insiders estimating the film could leg out to $20 million. By mid-February 2021, in its 20th week of release, the film was still playing in 653 theaters and grossed $224,000, for a running total of $20.3 million.

Critical response 
The website's critics consensus reads, "Fitfully funny but mostly misguided, The War with Grandpa will leave audiences with a handful of chuckles—and a lot of questions about what this talented cast was thinking." On Metacritic, it has a weighted average score of 34 out of 100, based on 23 critics, indicating "generally unfavorable reviews." Audiences polled by CinemaScore gave the film an average grade of "B+" on an A+ to F scale.

On RogerEbert.com, Christy Lemire gave the film one out of four stars, calling it "a straining comedy" featuring a "wildly overqualified" cast. Jude Dry of IndieWire gave the film a "D+" and wrote: "...the killer cast is sorely wasted on an utterly inane script about a spoiled kid who inexplicably decides he hates his very nice grandpa for moving into his room. Based on the popular kids' book by Robert Kimmel Smith, The War with Grandpa is a sluggish hodgepodge of slapstick humor that barely holds together its illogically motivated plot."

Peter Travers, reviewing the film for ABC News, wrote: "It's an individual choice whether or not to risk bringing children to theaters to see The War with Grandpa... But if you take the plunge and keep your expectations low, you could do worse than watching De Niro and company shake their sillies out."

Sequel 
In November 2020, producers Marvin and Rosa Peart announced their intentions for a sequel, titled The World War with Grandpa, which was subtly foreshadowed by the final scene of the movie.

References

External links
 
 

American comedy films
American children's comedy films
Films based on American novels
Films based on children's books
Films directed by Tim Hill
Films scored by Aaron Zigman
Films about old age
MoviePass Films films
Universal Pictures films
Films shot in Atlanta
2020 films
2020 comedy films
2020s English-language films
2020s American films